Sørvágsvatn is the largest lake in the Faroe Islands. It is situated on the island of Vágar between the municipalities of Sørvágur and Vágar. Its area is 3.4 km2, more than three times the size of Fjallavatn, the second largest lake, also located on Vágar.

Name 
Among the locals, there is disagreement regarding the name of the lake. The inhabitants of Sørvágur to the west prefer Sørvágsvatn, which means "the lake by Sørvágur".  The inhabitants of Miðvágur and Sandavágur to the east prefer Leitisvatn, which means "the lake by Leiti", referring to the territory on the east side of it.

The village of Miðvágur is situated closer to the lake than Sørvágur, but the latter is considered to have been settled earlier. Sørvágur – alongside Bøur and Sandavágur – is considered one of the three original settlements on Vágar. These divided the land on the island into three equal regions of 60 marks, which would place the lake within Sørvágur's region.

The locals mostly refer to it as Vatnið ("the lake"), which is understood as a reference to that body of water. It is mostly when people from other parts of the Faroes refer to the lake by one of its given names that the debate will occur.

Geography 

The lake is located very close to the ocean, but its surface is about 40 meters above the level of the sea. It is surrounded by a higher cliff which prevents it from emptying fully into the ocean, the waterfall Bøsdalafossur being the outlet. The greater height of the cliffs on either side of Bøsdalafossur can give the illusion from certain perspectives that the lake is higher above sea level than it is.

History 
During World War II, the British army built an airfield (now Vágar Airport) to the west of the lake. They also built a station to support seaplanes. The first aircraft to land on the lake was a Catalina from RAF Coastal Command, in 1941.

Places and names 
 Trælanípan
 Oyrar
 Bøsdalafossur
 Sjatlá
 Sálarbótsá

Tourism 
There are opportunities for fishing brown trout on the lake. In the summer of 2005 a local initiative was set up for boat excursions on it.

References 

Lakes of the Faroe Islands
Vágar